Ephraim Hertzano (1912– September 1987) was a Romanian-born Israeli board game designer. He is the inventor of the board game, Rummikub.

Biography 
Ephraim Hertzano was born in Romania, to a Jewish family. He originally sold toothbrushes and cosmetics. He invented the tile game Rummikub in the 1940s when card-playing was outlawed under the Communist regime. In the 1940s, after immigrating to British Mandate of Palestine (now Israel) after World War II, the former perfume seller developed the first sets with his family in the backyard of his home in Bat Yam.

Over the years, the family licensed it to other countries and Rummikub became Israel's best selling export game. In 1977, it became a best-selling game in the United States. The following year Hertzano published an Official Rummikub Book, which describes three different versions of the game: American, Sabra, and International. The game was first made by Lemada Light Industries Ltd, founded by Hertzano in 1978 and today is one of the most popular family games of all time.

Hertzano died in September 1987.

Awards and recognition 
Spiel des Jahres, 1980, for RummikubSpel van het Jaar, 1983, for Rummikub''

See also
Israeli inventions and discoveries

References

Romanian inventors
20th-century Romanian businesspeople
Israeli inventors
20th-century Israeli businesspeople
Board game designers
Romanian emigrants to Mandatory Palestine
1912 births
1987 deaths
Israeli Ashkenazi Jews
Romanian Ashkenazi Jews